The Louis Delsignore Three-Decker is a historic triple decker in Worcester, Massachusetts.  Built about 1916, it is the only stuccoed triple decker in the city, and is a symbol of the city's eastward growth fueled by the arrival of Italian immigrants.  It was listed on the National Register of Historic Places in 1990.

Description and history
The Louis Delsignore Three-Decker is located in Worcester eastern Shrewsbury Street residential area, on the east side of Imperial Road at its junction with Imperial Place.  It is a three-story frame structure, with a flat roof that has a deep projecting cornice.  The exterior is finished in stucco, believed to be the only triple-decker in the city finished in that way.  The front facade is asymmetrical, with a porch stack on the left, and a projecting window bay on the right.  Its porch openings have distinctive hood moulds, and the window bays are rounded rather than the more usual polygon shape.  A second projecting window bay, shallower than that on the front, is found on the right side.  A small garage, also finished in stucco, is set at the back of the property.

Built about 1916, its first documented owner was Louis Delsignore, a mason who may have been responsible for its stucco finish.  The building's early owners and occupants were Italian immigrants, a population that was expanding into southeastern Worcester in the first two decades of the 20th century.

See also
National Register of Historic Places listings in eastern Worcester, Massachusetts

References

Apartment buildings on the National Register of Historic Places in Massachusetts
Houses completed in 1916
Apartment buildings in Worcester, Massachusetts
National Register of Historic Places in Worcester, Massachusetts